Kwum Yam Shrine is a Taoist shrine at the southeastern end of Repulse Bay, in the southern part of Hong Kong Island.

Gallery

External links

Taoist temples in Hong Kong
Repulse Bay